Lubna Boby Jaffery  (born 2 April 1980) is a Norwegian politician for the Labour Party.

Born in Norway to parents of Pakistani origin she grew up in Bergen. She took her secondary education in Åsane in 1999, and at the University of Bergen she took the cand.mag. degree in 2004 and the master's degree in 2007. She was an adviser in the Workers' Youth League in 2000, before becoming a central board member from 2000 to 2004. She had previously chaired the county branch from 1998 to 1999. Jaffery was a member of Bergen city council from 1999 to 2003 and Fjell municipal council from 2003 to 2007.

In 2008 Jaffery was appointed as a political advisor in the Ministry of Labour and Social Inclusion. From March to October 2009 she was a political advisor in the Minister of Health and Care Services. From 2009 to 2012 she was a State Secretary in the Ministry of Culture as a part of Stoltenberg's Second Cabinet.

Jaffery was a deputy representative in the Parliament of Norway during the terms 2009–2013, 2013–2017, 2017–2021 and 2021–2025. In 2021 she was promoted to full member, covering for Marte Mjøs Persen after Persen was appointed to Støre's Cabinet.

References 

1980 births
Living people
University of Bergen alumni
Politicians from Bergen
Labour Party (Norway) politicians
Norwegian state secretaries
Norwegian women state secretaries
Members of the Storting
Norwegian people of Pakistani descent
Women members of the Storting
21st-century Norwegian politicians